Martina Navratilova and Jana Novotná won in the final 6–4, 6–2 against Iva Majoli and Nathalie Tauziat.

Draw

Finals

External links
 Completed Matches

Women's Legends Doubles